The Bushman's River is an east to north-easterly flowing tributary of the Tugela River, in the KwaZulu-Natal province of South Africa. It rises in the Drakensberg Mountain range, with its upper catchment in the Giant's Castle Game Reserve, north of the Giant's Castle promontory. It feeds the Wagendrift Dam and then flows past the town of Estcourt to join the Tugela River near the town of Weenen.

Its tributaries include the Little Bushmans River which joins the Bushmans River at Estcourt, Rensburgspruit, Mtontwanes River and the Mugwenya River. The Wagendrift Dam near Estcourt is its major reservoir. Several densely populated rural villages, many inhabited by the amaHlubi, are found in the river's upper catchment area.  The river is flanked by the Bloukrans River to the north and the Mooi River to the south.

See also 
 List of rivers of South Africa
 List of reservoirs and dams in South Africa

References

External links
 List of South African Dams Department of Water Affairs and Forestry (South Africa)

Rivers of KwaZulu-Natal